Ponometia libedis is a bird dropping moth in the family Noctuidae. The species was first described by Smith in 1900.

The MONA or Hodges number for Ponometia libedis is 9096.

References

Further reading

External links
 

Acontiinae
Articles created by Qbugbot
Moths described in 1900